Perplexisaurus is a genus of therocephalian therapsid from the Middle to Late Permian Deltavjatia vjatkensis Assemblage Zone, Vanyushonki Member of the Urpalov Formation of Russia. It was described by L. P. Tatarinov in 1997, and the type species is P. foveatus. A new species, P. lepusculus, was described by M.F. Ivachnenko in 2011, from Russia.

References

External links 
 Perplecisaurus at the Paleobiology Database

Ictidosuchids
Guadalupian synapsids
Lopingian synapsids of Europe
Fossils of Russia
Fossil taxa described in 1997